The 2018 Dwars door West-Vlaanderen was the 72nd edition of the Dwars door West-Vlaanderen road cycling one day race. It was part of UCI Europe Tour in category 1.1.

Teams
Twenty-two teams were invited to take part in the race. These included two UCI World Tour teams, twelve UCI Professional Continental teams and eight UCI Continental teams.

Result

References

Dwars door West-Vlaanderen
Dwars door West–Vlaanderen
Dwars door West–Vlaanderen